Roome may refer to:

Places
 Roome Township, Polk County, Minnesota, U.S.

People
Alfred Roome (1908–1997), British film editor and director
Charles Roome (1812–1890), American soldier and engineer
Edward Roome (died 1729), English lawyer and writer
Horace Roome (1887–1964), British army officer, father of Oliver Roome
Howard Roome (died 1931), American football player
John Roome (born 1972), British hiphop artist
Oliver Roome (1921–2009), British army officer, son of Horace Roome
William Frederick Roome (1841–1921), Canadian politician

See also 

Room (disambiguation)